Merrecia James (born September 16, 1985) is a track and field middle distance athlete, competed collegiately for the University of Maryland Eastern Shore. She is the daughter of Merle Stewart and William James of Jamaica. She has seven half brothers and five half sisters. She represented Jamaica at the North American Central American Caribbean cross country meet in 2004, 2005 and 2006, winning the bronze medal, in 2005 the world half marathon championships in Edmonton Canada and in 2006 the world cross country championship in Fukuoka, Japan. She finished 2nd for Jamaica at the Central American Caribbean reggae half marathon in a time of 1:28:08. In her mid-twenties, James was in Chicago when she was introduced to The Church of Jesus Christ of Latter-day Saints. She was baptized soon afterward.

Early life and career

James was raised by a single parent in the rural community of Portland, Jamaica.  She attended Port Antonio High School, where she earned 9 CXC's in a variety of subjects and earned a scholarship to G.C. Foster college. In college, she earned a certificate in Physical Education in 2006.  Also in 2006, she was admitted, with the intent to pursue a degree in Exercise Science and Physical Therapy, to the University of Maryland Eastern Shore  on a full athletic scholarship, where she has achieved success as a middle distance runner.  As a Maryland, she consistently placed 1st in cross-country, 800 m, 1500 m, mile, and 5000 m races in the Mid-Eastern Athletic Conference, as well as qualifying for Division I NCAA national indoor and outdoor championships in 2007-2008.  Additionally, she was a COSIDA All-American in 2007 for her academic and athletic achievements. In 2013, James graduated with a Masters of Medical Science in Physician Assistant from St. Francis University.

Race videos

Major achievements

Personal bests

References

1985 births
Living people
People from Port Antonio
University of Maryland Eastern Shore alumni
Jamaican female middle-distance runners